The 1996 Navy Midshipmen football team represented the United States Naval Academy (USNA) as an independent during the 1996 NCAA Division I-A football season. The team was led by second-year head coach Charlie Weatherbie.

Schedule

Roster

References

Navy
Navy Midshipmen football seasons
Aloha Bowl champion seasons
Navy Midshipmen football